Hayes railway station is a railway station located in Hayes in the London Borough of Bromley, south east London, England.

The main entrance is in the centre of a shopping arcade on Station Approach, with a secondary entrance from the car park on Old Station Yard.

The station is served by Southeastern services from Charing Cross and Cannon Street. It forms the suburban terminus for trains on the Hayes line. For historical reasons, and to avoid confusion with Hayes & Harlington, the station is still referred to as "Hayes (Kent)" on most timetables.

History

Opening and early years (1882-1923)
The Mid-Kent line was built by the Mid Kent and North Kent Junction and was operated on opening as far as Beckenham Junction on 1 January 1857 by the South Eastern Railway (SER). The line was extended to Addiscombe in 1864 and Elmers End (the future junction for the Hayes branch) was opened that year.

The Hayes branch line from Elmers End was built by the West Wickham & Hayes Railway, but was sold to the South Eastern Railway on the opening day, 29 May 1882. Initially the 13 weekday and four Sunday services operated as far as Elmers End where they connected with Addiscombe to London trains. The initial layout at Hayes consisted of a single platform with a locomotive turntable at the far end. A goods yard was provided on the south side of the station and a 33-lever signal box was provided.

In 1898 the South Eastern Railway and the London Chatham and Dover Railway agreed to work as one railway company under the name of the South Eastern and Chatham Railway and Hayes became a SE&CR station.

By 1912 services had increased to 15 each way but only two of these actually operated through to London the rest terminating at Elmers End. In 1909 however the 8:37 a.m. Hayes - Charing Cross service was formed of Continental boat train stock where on arrival it was used to work the 10:00 a.m. Charing Cross- Folkestone boat train.

Southern Railway (1923-1947)
Following the Railways Act 1921 (also known as the Grouping Act), Hayes became a Southern Railway station on 1 January 1923.

The early single-storey, clapboard building was enough for the initial demand in an area of London that saw urbanisation relatively late. Usage remained low until electrification was completed in 1925 with electric services commencing on 21 September that year. As suburban development gained pace, the station was modernised in 1933 with shops being incorporated into the entrance and the goods yard extended in anticipation of more coal traffic. On the night of 15/16 September 1940, the station building was badly damaged by a bomb and subsequently repaired in 1956.

British Railways (1948-1994)
On 1 January 1948 following nationalisation of the railways Hayes became part of British Railways Southern Region.

The goods yard closed on 19 April 1965 although the station continued to handle greyhound dogs travelling between Catford and training kennels in Ireland.

During the 1960s passenger numbers fell as many commuters were driving to Bromley South and Beckenham Junction to take advantage of faster services.

Upon sectorisation in 1982, three passenger sectors were created: InterCity, operating principal express services; and London & South East (renamed Network SouthEast in 1986) who operated commuter services in the London area.

The privatisation era (1994-Present Day)

Following privatisation of British Rail on 1 April 1994 the infrastructure at Hayes station became the responsibility of Railtrack whilst a business unit operated the train services. On 13 October 1996 operation of the passenger services passed to Connex South Eastern who were originally due to run the franchise until 2011.

Following a number of accidents and financial issues Railtrack plc was sold to Network Rail on 3 October 2002 who became responsible for the infrastructure.

On 27 June 2003 the Strategic Rail Authority decided to strip Connex of the franchise citing poor financial management and run the franchise itself. Connex South Eastern continued to operate the franchise until 8 November 2003 with the services transferring to the Strategic Rail Authority's South Eastern Trains subsidiary the following day.

In 2004, the Strategic Rail Authority proposed withdrawing services to Charing Cross from the Hayes Line. Following a campaign led by local Councillors and the Hayes Village Association, the plans were withdrawn.

On 30 November 2005 the Department for Transport awarded Govia the Integrated Kent franchise. The services operated by South Eastern Trains transferred to Southeastern on 1 April 2006.

On 21 January 2016, Transport for London announced that it was proposing to take over the London suburban parts of the Southeastern franchise, rebranding the routes as London Overground from that point.

Now, it is commonly used by school children from Hayes School, Baston House School and Ravensbourne School.

Transport for London proposal
In 2014, Transport for London began investigating a possible extension of the Bakerloo line from Elephant & Castle tube station through Southwark towards Lewisham, Bromley and Hayes. One of the options involves the Bakerloo line extension replacing the existing National Rail line between Lewisham and Hayes.

Services 

The typical off-peak service is four trains per hour to London Charing Cross.

On Sundays, the station is served by a half-hourly service to London Charing Cross via Lewisham.

Connections
London Buses routes 119, 138, 246, 314, 353 and 638 serve the station.

References

External links 

Railway stations in the London Borough of Bromley
Former South Eastern Railway (UK) stations
Railway stations in Great Britain opened in 1882
Railway stations served by Southeastern